Carrhouse railway station, also known as Carr House railway station, served the area of Carrhouse, County Durham, England, from 1858 to 1868 on the Stanhope and Tyne Railway.

History 
The station opened on 1 July 1858 by the North Eastern Railway. It was a short-lived station, closing 10 years later on 1 October 1868.

References

External links 

Disused railway stations in County Durham
Former North Eastern Railway (UK) stations
Railway stations in Great Britain opened in 1858
Railway stations in Great Britain closed in 1868
1858 establishments in England
1868 disestablishments in England